Jack Renner is the name of:
Jack Renner (golfer), American golfer
Jack Renner (recording engineer), classically trained musician and recording engineer